The Wa Self-Administered Division is an autonomous self-administered division in Myanmar (Burma). Its official name was announced by decree on 20 August 2010.

The area was declared by Myanmar's government to be self-administered by the Wa people, but is currently de facto administered by the self-proclaimed Wa State, under the official name Wa Special Region 2.

Administrative divisions 
As stipulated by the 2008 constitution, the administrative region consists of the following townships in Shan State:
 Hopang District
 Hopang Township
 Mongmao Township
 Pangwaun Township (Panwai)
 Namtit Subtownship
 Panlong Subtownship
 Matman District
 Matman Township (Metman)
 Namphan Township (Nahpan)
 Pangsang Township (Pangkham)

References

See also 
 Wa States

Wa people
Self-administered divisions of Myanmar
Subdivisions of Myanmar